Sam Boardman-Jacobs (born 1942) ( Died January 2022)is a Yorkshire-born but Midlands & London raised playwright, director and scenographer who now lives in France & Spain (after 25 years based in Glamorgan, Wales), He has recently become a choreographer as well, since he received a master's degree from Trinity/ Laban.  He now commutes between France, Spain and the UK.

Biography
Boardman-Jacobs was Reader in Theatre & Media Drama at the University of Glamorgan. His research interests include Holocaust drama, Yiddish theatre, gay and lesbian theatre, Spanish playwright Federico García Lorca, and the Spanish Civil War. These interests are reflected in his plays.

He won acclaim for his work on Holocaust and Yiddish drama with the Manchester Youth Theatre and received a grant from the European Association of Jewish Culture in 2002 for his play Trying To Be, an exploration of Jewish identity set in contemporary Britain. 
Sam recently took an MA in Choreography at Laban, London, and now makes choreographic dance theatre with  Found Reality Dance Theatre, Cardiff, of which he is artistic director.

Play Federico For Me is the fictional story of Catalan actress Margarita Xirgu, who, during her exile after the Spanish Civil War, depends upon the ghost of Federico García Lorca, in her political-artistic battle with Eva Perón over the first performance of Lorca's "The House of Bernarda Alba". His translation and adaptation of Lorca's El público was produced by the Found Reality Theatre Company in 2005. His 2007 radio play, The Sixth Column Has Better Legs, describes the experiences of four chorus girls in Madrid while the city is under siege.

Passion for the Impossible tells the story of Violette Leduc and Jean Genet in wartime Paris and Red Hot and Blue is the story of singer Libby Holman, on the night before her suicide, as she looks back over a life that included a murder trial, an affair with Montgomery Clift and early Civil Rights campaigning during the Second World War.

In 2003 he taught for the Lemonia Disabled Writers' Residential Course, a project organised by Graeae Theatre Company, Writernet and Tŷ Newydd. The production of his 2004 play, Embracing Barbarians, based on the political and sexual fantasies of dying Greek poet Constantine Cavafy, Sam attempted to make the piece accessible to both deaf and hearing performers and audiences, while casting a deaf performer in the role of a hearing character.

He has taught on several  Writing Menoring and Dramaturgy courses at venues ranging from The Soho Theatre and  The Actor's centre London to the Arvon Foundation and Ty Newydd in North Wales and on  MA in Scriptwriting courses in Cardiff and Exeter. He now teaches Master classes in Scriptwriting and Dramaturgy in France and the UK.

He was also a scriptwriter for 12 years on BBC Radio 4's The Archers and one of the  writers for Channel 4's Brookside. He translates from Spanish to English.

Stage plays
 Someone Else’s Rainbow, 1979
 Setting Out For Ithaca 1980
 Farblas! 1996
 Play Federico For Me, 1998
 Passion for the Impossible, 1999
 Asylum, 2001
 Trying To Be, 2002
 Why Is This Night?, 2003
 Embracing Barbarians, 2004
 The Public 2005 (English translation from Lorca's El Público)
 Red Hot & Blue 2007

Radio plays
 Her Name Was Milena 1982
 Last Friday in Jerusalem 1984
 Fanny Rosen's Bad Debt 1985
 After Every Dream 1988
 Facing the Sun 1986
 After Every Dream 1988
 Doesn't Everyone Live in a Ballroom? 1991
 Hangover Square (dramatised from Patrick Hamilton's novel) 1994
 The Abduction of Esther Lyons, 1999
 One Pair of Hands, (5 Part Series) 2001 (adaptation of the novel by Monica Dickens)
 The Sixth Column Has Better Legs (5-part series) 2007

Dance theatre productions
with Found Reality Dance Theatre:
 Soft Murders (three dance theatre pieces based on the paintings of three gay artists: Gilbert & George, Andy Warhol, Francis Bacon. Chapter Arts Theatre; Atrium Theatre Cardiff; Cardiff and Edinburgh Fringe Festivals.
 "Cabaret of Pain" Work in progress created to explore  the Taboo of Pain in Performance. Shown as a Conference Intervention at ATRIUM Theatre Cardiff as part of the TAPRA Drama conference.
 "The Mayakovsky Project" Based on the performance practices of Meyerhold and an intended as a showcase training manual by Found Reality Theatre for teachers of physical performance practice."Each One Teach One-Training Trainers to Train Practitioners to Train performance practitioners
 "Street of Crocodiles" an Homage to Tadeusz Kantor- Found Reality Theatre Co in Collaboration with University of Glamorgan Theatre Department.
 "Black and Blue" -A body in pain is a city under siege Chapter Arts Center Cardiff.
 "Occupied Women" Women fashion & Collaboration in Occupied France in 1944 Théâtre du petit chapiteau,  St Jean D'Angely France.

References

External links
 Radio plays

Welsh dramatists and playwrights
Yiddish theatre
Disability theatre
The Archers
2022 deaths
1942 births
People involved with disability